Joe Kinsella was an Ireland international footballer.

International career
On 12 February 1928, Kinsella made his only appearance for Ireland in a 4–2 win over Belgium in Liège.

References

Republic of Ireland association footballers
Republic of Ireland international footballers
League of Ireland players
Year of birth missing
Place of birth missing
Year of death missing
Shelbourne F.C. players
Association football midfielders